Abraham Lincoln High School, a public school located in the Mayfair section of Northeast Philadelphia, Pennsylvania. Its main entrance is located at Ryan and Rowland Avenues. The principal is Jack Nelson.

It serves Mayfair, Holmesburg, and Torresdale.

Overview
Abraham Lincoln is widely known as Philadelphia's "All-Academy" high school. Students can choose from a variety of academies, including law, business, horticulture, environmental science, health, and fine and performing arts. 

Lincoln offers an academy for students who speak a language other than traditional American English, including a program for the deaf and hard-of-hearing.

Students may choose from sports such as football, soccer, cheerleading, track, baseball, swimming, softball, bowling and wrestling. The school has a band and a choir, both of which perform a Christmas concert and a spring musical annually, in addition to performances for the local community, and city.

The school is also staffed with Non-Teaching Assistants ("NTA's") and a school police group supplemented by the Philadelphia Police Department to ensure that all students are provided a safe school environment.

History

Lincoln was originally scheduled to be named Mayfair High School, but opposition from other neighborhoods, including Holmesburg, meant that the school was instead named after Abraham Lincoln. Mayfair residents had a negative reception to this change. In 1949 the school's cornerstone was laid. Its current campus opened in 2009.

School uniforms
Students wear school uniforms. Students wear a gold, white or black polo shirt and any sort of black pants.

Popular culture
Lincoln's Marching Band was featured in '"Rocky III"' in a scene in which he was honored in front of the Philadelphia Museum of Art; this is the scene where the still-iconic Rocky Balboa statue was first unveiled. A scene for "Rocky II" was filmed in the Lincoln High School auditorium, but the scene was not used in the film.  In the cut scene, Rocky Balboa was awarded an honorary high school diploma.  Like his fictional character, Sylvester Stallone attended Lincoln but did not graduate, due to his boxing career, though his brother Frank did.

Feeder patterns
Feeder middle schools and K-8 schools into Lincoln:
 Ethan Allen School
 Hamilton Disston School
 Mayfair School
 Austin Meehan Middle School

Feeder elementary schools:
 Joseph H. Brown Elementary School
 T. Holme Elementary School
 E. Forrest Elementary School
 R. B. Pollock Elementary School
 W. H. Ziegler Elementary School

Alumni
Glenn Brenner, Washington, D.C., sportscaster
Larry Cannon, former professional basketball player
Gia Carangi, supermodel
George H. Heilmeier, engineer who was contributor to the invention of LCDs
Ed Neilson, Pennsylvania State Representative
Jerry Reitman, author, businessman, and advertising executive
Frank Stallone, actor and younger brother of Sylvester Stallone
Sylvester Stallone, actor

References

External links
 Abraham Lincoln High School
  (2000-2009)

Public high schools in Pennsylvania
School District of Philadelphia
Northeast Philadelphia
1949 establishments in Pennsylvania